The 2017 Australian Open was a tennis tournament that took place at Melbourne Park between 16 and 29 January 2017. It was the 105th edition of the Australian Open, and the first Grand Slam tournament of the year. The tournament consisted of events for professional players in singles, doubles and mixed doubles play. Junior and wheelchair players competed in singles and doubles tournaments. As in previous years, the tournament's title sponsor was Kia.

Novak Djokovic and Angelique Kerber were the defending champions and both were unsuccessful in their title defence; they lost to Denis Istomin and CoCo Vandeweghe in the second and fourth rounds, respectively. For the first time since the 2004 French Open, both No. 1 seeds lost before the quarterfinals, with both Andy Murray and Kerber defeated in the fourth round.

Roger Federer won his eighteenth men's singles Grand Slam title by defeating Rafael Nadal in a five-set final. It was his first major title since 2012 Wimbledon and a rematch of the 2009 Australian Open final, which Nadal won in five sets. Serena Williams overcame her sister Venus in the women's singles final, surpassing Steffi Graf to become the player with the most major wins in the women's game in the Open Era.

Tournament

The 2017 Australian Open was the 105th edition of the tournament and was held at Melbourne Park in Melbourne, Australia.

The tournament was run by the International Tennis Federation (ITF) and is part of the 2017 ATP World Tour and the 2017 WTA Tour calendars under the Grand Slam category. The tournament consisted of both men's and women's singles and doubles draw as well as a mixed doubles event. There were singles and doubles events for both boys and girls (players under 18), which are part of the Grade A category of tournaments, and also singles, doubles, and quad events for men's and women's wheelchair tennis players as part of the NEC tour under the Grand Slam category.

The tournament was played on hard courts and took place over a series of 25 courts, including the three main show courts: Rod Laver Arena, Hisense Arena and Margaret Court Arena.

Broadcast
In Australia, selected key matches were broadcast live by the Seven Network. The majority of matches was shown on the network's primary channel Channel Seven; however, during news programming nationwide and most night matches in Perth, coverage shifted to either 7Two or 7mate. Additionally, every match was also available to be streamed live through a free 7Tennis mobile app.

Internationally, Eurosport held the rights for Europe, broadcasting matches on Eurosport 1, Eurosport 2 and the Eurosport Player.

Singles players
Men's singles

Women's singles

Events

Men's singles

   Roger Federer defeated  Rafael Nadal, 6–4, 3–6, 6–1, 3–6, 6–3
This was a rematch of the 2009 Australian Open final, which Rafael Nadal won to become the first (and to date, only) Spaniard to win the Australian Open title. The final saw the two holding service for six games of the first set, whilst during the seventh game was the pivotal break of serve giving Federer the opening set. Nadal quickly broke Federer's serve in the second set racing out to a lead that Federer could not overcome, giving him the second set and leveling the match at one set apiece. The third set was a rather lopsided affair seeing Nadal secure his service game only in the fourth game of the set. The fourth set started off competitively with the two holdings serve until Nadal broke in the fourth game of the set, a lead he would never surrender, evening the match at two sets apiece. The decisive fifth set commenced with a break of Federer's serve by Nadal, giving him a lead in the early going; however, Nadal's serve got broken during the sixth game of the set, leveling the match at two sets and three games apiece. Federer won the next three games breaking Nadal's service in the eighth game of the set to allow him to successfully serve out the match in the final ninth game. This was Roger Federer's 18th Grand Slam singles title, the most ever by a man in the history of tennis, and it was his fifth Australian Open title, just one shy of the record co-held by Novak Djokovic and Roy Emerson. Federer would go on to equal this record by defending his title successfully the next year.

Women's singles

  Serena Williams defeated  Venus Williams, 6–4, 6–4
This was a rematch of the 2003 Australian Open final, where Serena Williams completed the first "Serena Slam" and her career Grand Slam, whilst Serena won five more Australian Open titles in the interim and her sister Venus had no other final appearances at the event. They each broke the others' serve twice to start the match with Venus finally holding serve in the fifth service game and her sister Serena holding her own serve in the subsequent game. The seventh game was the pivotal break of service that Serena Williams got on her sister Venus' serve, costing her the set just a mere three games later. During the second set, the two traded held service games for the first six games to start the set, whilst Venus started serving first. She would get broken again during the seventh game of the set, which eventually surrendered the match to sister Serena. This was Serena Williams' 23 Grand Slam singles title and seventh Australian Open title for her career, both being Open era records, whilst being one shy of Margaret Court's record of 24 in the history of tennis.

Men's doubles

  Henri Kontinen /  John Peers defeated.  Bob Bryan /  Mike Bryan, 7–5, 7–5

Women's doubles

  Bethanie Mattek-Sands /  Lucie Šafářová defeated  Andrea Hlaváčková /  Peng Shuai, 6–7(4–7), 6–3, 6–3

Mixed doubles

  Abigail Spears /  Juan Sebastián Cabal defeated  Sania Mirza /  Ivan Dodig, 6–2, 6–4

Wheelchair men's singles

  Gustavo Fernández defeated  Nicolas Peifer, 3–6, 6–2, 6–0

Wheelchair women's singles

  Yui Kamiji defeated  Jiske Griffioen, 6–7(2–7), 6–3, 6–3

Wheelchair quad singles

  Dylan Alcott defeated  Andrew Lapthorne, 6–2, 6–2

Wheelchair men's doubles

  Joachim Gérard /  Gordon Reid defeated  Gustavo Fernández /  Alfie Hewett, 6–3, 3–6, [10–3]

Wheelchair women's doubles

  Jiske Griffioen /  Aniek van Koot defeated  Diede de Groot /  Yui Kamiji, 6–3, 6–2

Wheelchair quad doubles

  Andrew Lapthorne /  David Wagner defeated  Dylan Alcott /  Heath Davidson, 6–3, 6–3

Boys' singles

  Zsombor Piros defeated  Yshai Oliel, 4–6, 6–4, 6–3

Girls' singles

  Marta Kostyuk defeated  Rebeka Masarova, 7–5, 1–6, 6–4

Boys' doubles

  Hsu Yu-hsiou /  Zhao Lingxi defeated  Finn Reynolds /  Duarte Vale, 6–7(8–10), 6–4, [10–5]

Girls' doubles

  Bianca Andreescu /  Carson Branstine defeated  Maja Chwalińska /  Iga Świątek, 6–1, 7–6(7–4)

Doubles seeds

Men's doubles

1 Rankings are as of 9 January 2017.

Women's doubles

1 Rankings are as of 9 January 2017.

Mixed doubles

1 Rankings are as of 9 January 2017.

Main draw wildcard entries

Men's doubles
  Matthew Barton /  Matthew Ebden
  Alex Bolt /  Bradley Mousley
  Alex de Minaur /  Max Purcell
  Hsieh Cheng-peng /  Yang Tsung-hua
  Marc Polmans /  Andrew Whittington
  Matt Reid /  John-Patrick Smith
  Luke Saville /  Jordan Thompson

Women's doubles
  Destanee Aiava /  Alicia Smith
  Alison Bai /  Lizette Cabrera
  Ashleigh Barty /  Casey Dellacqua
  Kimberly Birrell /  Priscilla Hon
  Chan Chin-wei /  Junri Namigata
  Jessica Moore /  Storm Sanders
  Ellen Perez /  Olivia Tjandramulia

Mixed doubles
  Destanee Aiava /  Marc Polmans
  Casey Dellacqua /  Matt Reid
  Daria Gavrilova /  Luke Saville
  Martina Hingis /  Leander Paes
  Pauline Parmentier /  Nicolas Mahut
  Sally Peers /  John Peers
  Arina Rodionova /  John-Patrick Smith
  Samantha Stosur /  Sam Groth

Point and prize money distribution

Point distribution
Below is a series of tables for each of the competitions showing the ranking points offered for each event.

Senior points

Wheelchair points

Junior points

Prize money
The Australian Open total prize money for 2017 was increased by 14% to a tournament record A$50,000,000.

1Qualifiers prize money was also the Round of 128 prize money.
*per team

References

External links
 Australian Open official website
 

 
 

 
2017 ATP World Tour
2017 in Australian tennis
2017 WTA Tour
January 2017 sports events in Australia